Samuel Studdiford Stratton (September 27, 1916 – September 13, 1990) was an American Democratic political figure in Upstate New York.  He is notable for his service as Mayor of Schenectady, and his 30-year career as a member of the United States House of Representatives.

Born in Yonkers, New York as the son of a Presbyterian clergyman, Stratton was a graduate of the University of Rochester, Haverford College, and Harvard University.  He worked for two years on the staff of a Massachusetts Congressman, and then served in the United States Navy during World War II.  After the war, he worked as an on-air personality for television and radio stations in Schenectady, and served on the city council.  He was recalled to active military duty for the Korean War, and served in Washington, DC.  he remained in the Navy Reserve until retiring at age 60 with the rank of captain

After returning to Schenectady, he was re-elected to the city council in 1953.  In 1955 he was elected mayor.  In 1958, Stratton ran successfully for Congress; he was reelected fourteen times, and served from 1959 to 1989.  After unsuccessful attempts to run for higher office and surviving efforts by the New York State Legislature to remove him through unfavorable redistricting, Stratton settled into a long career as a senior member of the Armed Services Committee.  In addition to paying attention to local defense concerns, including  manufacturing contracts for General Electric and the Watervliet Arsenal, Stratton took a lead role on other military-related issues, including admitting women to the service academies.

Stratton abandoned his last reelection campaign in 1988 because of health issues, and retired to his home in Maryland.  He died in Maryland in 1990, and was buried at Arlington National Cemetery.

Early life
Stratton was born in Yonkers, New York, the son of the Reverend Paul Stratton (1876–1942) and Ethel Irene Russell (1883–1970).  His family moved to Schenectady, New York while he was an infant. He attended school in Schenectady, Rochester, and at Blair Academy in New Jersey. He received a Bachelor of Arts degree from the University of Rochester in 1937, was a captain of the swim team, and joined Phi Beta Kappa and Psi Upsilon.  He received a Master of Arts degree in Philosophy from Haverford College in 1938, and a Master of Arts in Philosophy from Harvard University in 1940.  Stratton was executive secretary to Massachusetts Congressman Thomas H. Eliot from 1940 to 1942.

Military
In mid-1942, Stratton joined the United States Naval Reserve. Commissioned an ensign, he served in the South West Pacific Area during World War II as a combat intelligence officer on the staff of General Douglas MacArthur. Twice awarded the Bronze Star with Valor device, Stratton's service was notable for his interrogation of Tomoyuki Yamashita, who was later executed for his part in the Manila massacre.

During the Korean War, Stratton was recalled to active duty, serving as an instructor at the Naval Intelligence School in Washington, D.C. from 1951 to 1953.  He attained the rank of commander in 1955, and retired as a captain in 1976.

Schenectady politics
After World War II, Stratton returned to Schenectady and was elected to the city council in 1949. He began serving as a member of Schenectady's Municipal Housing Authority in 1950, and remained with the Authority until 1955, including holding the position of chairman in 1951.

Following his Korean War service, Stratton returned to Schenectady and was re-elected to the city council, where he served from 1953 to 1956. In 1955, he was elected mayor of Schenectady as a conservative Democrat. For a period of time while he was mayor, he supplemented his salary by working as an on-air announcer, newscaster, and commentator on politics and current events for WRGB, the NBC television affiliate in Schenectady, as well as other local television and radio stations.  His television career included appearances as the children's character Sagebrush Sam, which required dressing as a cowboy and playing a harmonica.  From 1957 to 1958, Stratton was also a financial services representative with the First Albany Corporation.

Congressional career
In 1958, Stratton was elected to the U.S. Congress. He rose through seniority to become the third-ranking Democrat on the Armed Services Committee; though he lost a race for chairman of the committee to Les Aspin in 1985, he chaired subcommittees including the one on Procurement and Military Nuclear Systems, and was recognized as an expert on defense issues.  Stratton consistently succeeded at winning reelection by appealing to conservative voters and supporting defense spending in his district, which included General Electric manufacturing plants and the Watervliet Arsenal.

For his first two terms, Stratton represented a relatively compact district centered around Schenectady. In the early 1960s, the Republican-controlled legislature tried to defeat him through unfavorable redistricting.  Stratton's home in Amsterdam was drawn into a district that snaked from the Capital District suburbs all the way west across Upstate as far as Auburn, including along the way some of the most rural and conservative territory in central New York. On paper, this district seemed unwinnable for a Democrat, even a conservative Democrat like Stratton. However, Stratton was reelected in 1962 with 54 percent of the vote.    He quickly became popular with the voters in this mostly rural district, and went on to win another four terms by well over 60 percent of the vote.  The state legislature gave up in the 1970s round of redistricting, and placed Stratton's home into a heavily Democratic seat including the heart of the Capital District. He easily defeated Republican incumbent Daniel Button, and was reelected seven more times without serious difficulty until retiring in 1989 at the age of 72.

In 1962, Stratton was a candidate for Governor of New York; Robert M. Morgenthau won the Democratic nomination, but lost the general election to incumbent Nelson A. Rockefeller.  Stratton was a candidate for the Democratic nomination for the United States Senate in 1964, hoping to challenge incumbent Kenneth Keating, but he was defeated by Robert F. Kennedy, who went on to win the election.

He was a proponent of the Equal Rights Amendment, and also introduced successful legislation, as a rider to the 1975 defense appropriations bill, which mandated the admission of women to the service academies.

In 1976, Stratton led an unsuccessful effort to cite journalist Daniel Schorr for Contempt of Congress after Schorr refused to identify his source for a copy of the Pike Committee report on the clandestine activities of the Central Intelligence Agency.  Schorr had provided the report to The Village Voice, which made its contents public.

Retirement and death

In 1988, Stratton announced his bid for reelection, and circulated nominating petitions to appear as a candidate for renomination in the Democratic primary.  On the last day that he was eligible to withdraw, Stratton announced his retirement.  This move gave his committee on vacancies—three party leaders named on his nominating petition—the ability to name a replacement.  The committee selected Michael R. McNulty, then serving in the New York State Assembly.  Stratton said he was retiring because of health concerns (he had long suffered from asthma and gout), but the obvious implication raised by his political opponents was that he had intended to retire all along, and wanted to make it easier for McNulty to succeed him.  Despite this minor controversy, McNulty obtained the Democratic nomination unopposed and went on to easily win the general election; Stratton retired at the end of his final term in January 1989.

After retiring, Stratton lived in Bethesda, Maryland.  He had a stroke in October 1989, after which he resided in a Potomac, Maryland nursing home.  Stratton died in Gaithersburg, Maryland on September 13, 1990, and was buried at Arlington National Cemetery, Section 7A, Grave 58.

Legacy
After Stratton's death, both the Air National Guard base in Scotia, New York and the Veterans Affairs hospital in Albany, New York were named in his honor.

In popular culture
The 1998 film The Pentagon Wars includes a scene in which Secretary of Defense Caspar Weinberger fields a phone call from an unseen and unheard Stratton about the procurement of the Bradley Fighting Vehicle.  After deflecting Stratton's concerns, Weinberger directs his subordinates to complete their investigation of the Bradley's field testing quickly and brief him on the results so he will not be surprised by more calls from members of Congress.

Family
In 1947, Stratton was married to Joan Harris (1921–2009).  They were the parents of five children: daughters Lisa, Debra, and Kim; and sons Kevin and Brian.

His son, Brian U. Stratton, was elected mayor of Schenectady in 2003. With the expected retirement of the elder Stratton's successor in Congress, Michael McNulty, there was speculation the younger Stratton would run for his father's old House seat in the 2008 election, but he chose to remain mayor, and later accepted an appointment as director of the New York State Canal Corporation.

See also
 United States congressional delegations from New York

References

Sources

Newspapers

Internet

Books

Magazine

External links
 Retrieved on 2008-02-19
 
 

1916 births
1990 deaths
Blair Academy alumni
University of Rochester alumni
Haverford College alumni
Harvard University alumni
Mayors of Schenectady, New York
Schenectady City Council members
Burials at Arlington National Cemetery
Democratic Party members of the United States House of Representatives from New York (state)
20th-century American politicians